Johannes Lodewyk Augustinus 'Johnny' Bester  (25 December 1917 – 14 May 1977) was a South African rugby union player.

Playing career
Bester matriculated at Jan van Riebeeck High School in Cape Town, after which he joined the Gardens Rugby Football Club, also situated within the Cape Town City Bowl.  Shortly thereafter, the 19-year-old Bester became the youngest member of Phil Nel's famous 1937 touring team to Australia and New Zealand. Although he did not play in any test matches on tour, he did play in twelve tour matches, scoring eight tries.

Bester, one of the few players to represent the Springboks before playing for his provincial team, (Danie Craven was another) made his debut for Western Province against Sam Walker's touring British Isles team at Newlands on the 25th of June 1938. Bester scored two tries in this match and Western Province won 21–11. Bester made his test debut for the Springboks, in the second test match against the touring British Isles team on the 3rd of September 1938 at the Crusaders Ground in Port Elizabeth. He also played in the third test against the British Isles and scored a try in each of his test matches.

Test history

See also
List of South Africa national rugby union players – Springbok no. 247

References

1917 births
1977 deaths
Alumni of Hoërskool Jan van Riebeeck
Rugby union players from Moorreesburg
South Africa international rugby union players
South African rugby union players
Western Province (rugby union) players
Rugby union centres